Beauty is the eighth solo studio album by Japanese musician Ryuichi Sakamoto. Both a Japanese and an international version were released by Virgin Records in 1989 and 1990, respectively. The international release contains the track "You Do Me (Edit)" featuring singer Jill Jones, a song previously released as a single.

Overview
Beauty is notable for its "collage of styles" that range from rock, techno, and classical to flamenco, African, and Japanese traditional. In discussing whether music is narrative and illustrative or an abstract medium, Sakamoto said, "I have visions sometimes when I'm writing contemporary music, even when it's very logical. For example, for one of my songs on the album Beauty, I was always having visions of Amazonian rainforests, a little plane flying very low over the trees. Trees, trees, trees, and some birds. But the title of the song is 'Calling from Tokyo'."

Recorded at various sound studios throughout Tokyo, New York, and Los Angeles, Beauty features many collaborators that include Arto Lindsay, Brian Wilson, Robbie Robertson, and Sly Dunbar. On his time working with Wilson, Sakamoto said, "I had asked Brian Wilson to sing on the album so I went to Los Angeles and we recorded with him. I had been informed that he had had a difficult time, some kind of mental illness, and I could sense that, even though he wasn't that surprising in the studio. But then the following day, I flew from LA back to New York to continue recording and he showed up without telling me, with his whole family in tow. The schedule was already tightly planned, but I was so grateful he'd come, so we made some time to work with him. It was a beautiful moment – one I won't forget for the rest of my life."

Track listing

Personnel
Performers

 Ryuichi Sakamoto – composer, producer, mixing, engineering, arranger, keyboards, piano, vocals
 Arto Lindsay – vocals, rap
 Brian Wilson – vocals
 Kazumi Tamaki – vocals, shamisen
 Misako Koja – vocals, shamisen
 Nicky Holland – vocals
 Yoriko Ganeko – vocals, shamisen, castanets
 Youssou N'Dour – vocals
 Laura Shaheen – vocals
 Robert Wyatt – vocals
 Jill Jones – vocals ("You Do Me")
 Alex Brown – backing vocals ("You Do Me")
 Angel Rogers – backing vocals ("You Do Me")
 Anita Sherman – backing vocals ("You Do Me")
 Kirk Crumpler – keyboards, programmer ("You Do Me")
 Carlos Lomas – guitar
 Bun Itakura – guitar
 Dali Kimoko-N’Dala – guitar
 Eddie Martinez – guitar, soloist
 Robbie Robertson – guitar
 Pino Palladino – bass
 Mark Johnson – bass
 Larry White – bass ("You Do Me")
 Sly Dunbar – drums
 Pandit Dinesh – tabla
 Naná Vasconcelos – percussion
 Paco Yé – percussion
 Seidou "Baba" Outtara – percussion
 Sibiri Outtara – percussion
 Magatie Fall – talking drum
 Milton Cardona – shekere
 L. Shankar – double violin
 Sang Won Park – zither
 Sham Guibbory – string section leader
 Jiang Jian Huo – erhu

Technical

 Greg Calbi – engineer, mastering
 Jason Corsaro – engineer, mixing
 Ikuo Honma – engineer
 Kinji Yoshino – engineer
 Mark Lynette – engineer
 Naoto Shibuya – engineer
 Roger Moutenot – engineer
 Yutaka Arai – engineer
 Carmen Rizzo – engineer, mixer, programmer ("You Do Me")
 Dan Gellert – assistant engineer
 Douglas Rose – assistant engineer
 Gary Solomon – assistant engineer
 John Herman – assistant engineer
 Junichi Yamazaki – assistant engineer
 Michael White – assistant engineer
 Seiichi Yoritomi – assistant engineer
 Tetsuya Ishizuka – assistant engineer
 Yuuki Mizutani – assistant engineer
 Darin Prindle – assistant engineer ("You Do Me")
 Kevin Casey – assistant engineer ("You Do Me")
 Sylvia Massy – assistant engineer ("You Do Me")
 Masaya Nishida – programming
 Jeff Bova – programming (drum sound, keyboards)
 Bill Seery – programming (drums)
 Yuji Suguyama – programming, computer operation
 Shingo Take – sampling

Charts

References

1989 albums
Ryuichi Sakamoto albums
Virgin Records albums
Albums produced by Ryuichi Sakamoto